Robert Lowe, 1st Viscount Sherbrooke, GCB, PC (4 December 1811 – 27 July 1892), British statesman, was a pivotal conservative spokesman who helped shape British politics in the latter half of the 19th century. He held office under William Ewart Gladstone as Chancellor of the Exchequer between 1868 and 1873 and as Home Secretary between 1873 and 1874. Lowe is remembered for his work in education policy, his opposition to electoral reform and his contribution to modern UK company law. Gladstone appointed Lowe as Chancellor expecting him to hold down public spending. Public spending rose, and Gladstone pronounced Lowe "wretchedly deficient"; most historians agree. Lowe repeatedly underestimated the revenue, enabling him to resist demands for tax cuts and to reduce the national debt instead. He insisted that the tax system be fair to all classes. By his own main criterion of fairness — that the balance between direct and indirect taxation remain unchanged — he succeeded. Even in his time, however,  this concept of fiscal incidence was obsolescent.

Early life 
Lowe was born in Bingham, Nottinghamshire, England, the second son of the Reverend Robert Lowe (rector of St Mary and All Saints, Bingham). His mother was Ellen, the daughter of the Rev. Reginald Pyndar. Lowe had albinism, and his sight was so weak that initially it was thought he was unfit to be sent to school.

In 1822, he went to a school at Southwell, then to one at Risley, and in 1825 to Winchester as a commoner. In Lowe's fragment of autobiography he shows an unpleasing picture of the under-feeding and other conditions of the school life of the time. The languages of Latin and Greek were the main subjects of study and Lowe records that both were easy for him. 

Lowe then attended University College, Oxford, and enjoyed the change; there as a pupil of Benjamin Jowett he gained a first class degree in Literae Humaniores and a second class in mathematics, besides taking a leading part in the Union debates. 

In 1835, he won a fellowship at Magdalen, but vacated it on marrying, on 26 March 1836, Georgiana Orred (d. 1884). Lowe was for a few years a successful tutor at Oxford, but in 1838 was disappointed at not being elected to the professorship of Greek at the University of Glasgow.

Australia
In 1841 Lowe moved to London to read for the Bar, but his eyesight showed signs of serious weakness, and, acting on medical advice, he sailed to Sydney in the colony of New South Wales, where he set to work in the law courts. On 7 November 1843 he was nominated by Sir George Gipps, the Governor of New South Wales, to a seat in the New South Wales Legislative Council replacing Robert Jones who had to resign from the Council due to insolvency. 

Owing to a difference of opinion with Gipps, Lowe resigned from the council on 9 September 1844, but was elected in April 1845 for Counties of St Vincent and Auckland. Lowe held that seat until 20 June 1848 and was elected for City of Sydney in July 1848, a seat he held until November 1849. 

Lowe soon made his mark in the political world by his clever speeches, particularly on finance and education; and besides obtaining a large legal practice, he was involved with the founding and was one of the principal writers for the Atlas newspaper.

In 1844, Lowe defended a Royal Navy captain, John Knatchbull, on a charge of murdering a widowed shopkeeper named Ellen Jamieson; he was one of the earliest to raise in a British court the plea of moral insanity (unsuccessfully). Knatchbull was hanged on 13 February 1844. Lowe and his wife adopted Mrs. Jamieson's two orphaned children, Bobby and Polly Jamieson.

On 27 January 1850, the Lowes and the two Jamieson children sailed to England.

British politics

Early years
Lowe's previous university reputation and connections combined with his colonial experience stood him in good stead; The Times was glad to employ him, and, as one of its ablest leader-writers, he made his influence widely felt. In 1852, he was returned to Parliament for Kidderminster in the Liberal interest. In the House of Commons, his acute reasoning made a considerable impression, and, under successive Liberal ministries (1853–1858), he obtained official experience as Secretary to the Board of Control and Vice-President of the Board of Trade. During his time there, he saw the Joint Stock Companies Act 1856 passed – the first nationwide codification of company law in the world. He has been referred to as "the father of modern company law". This status was again referred to in the presentation by Lord Sainsbury of the second reading leading up to the new United Kingdom Companies Act 2006:
"One hundred and fifty years ago, my predecessor Robert Lowe, later First Viscount Sherbrooke, brought forward the Bill that created the joint stock limited liability company. It was the first nationwide codification of company law in the world, and he has recently been described as "the father of modern company law". Our company law continues to have an excellent record. Since 1997 new incorporations have risen by over 60 per cent and the number of foreign firms incorporating in the UK has more than quadrupled. No doubt this is because, according to the World Bank's assessment, it is quicker and cheaper for companies to set up in the UK than in any other EU member state."

In 1859, Lowe went to the Education Office as Vice-President of the Committee of the Council on Education in Lord Palmerston's ministry; there he pursued a vigorous policy, insisting on payment by results, and bringing in the revised code (1862), which embodied this principle and made an examination in "the three R's" the test for grants of public money. He felt then, and still more after the Reform Act of 1867, that "we must educate our masters," and he rather scandalized his old university friends by the stress he laid on physical science as opposed to classical studies. Considerable opposition was aroused by the new regime at the Education Office, and, in 1864, Lowe was driven to resign by an adverse vote in Parliament with reference to the way in which inspectors' reports were "edited." This was the result of the strong feelings that had been aroused against Lingen's administration of the Education Office.

Reform 

Lord Palmerston had been a towering opponent to widening democratic participation and his death in October 1865 opened the way to the Russell–Gladstone reform ministry, which introduced the Reform Bill of 1866. Lowe carried on his former Prime Minister's views, as part of the Canning and Peel Liberal school. Moreover, he had been heavily shocked by his experiences of the comparatively developed union movement in his time in Australia in a less rigid class system. He had already made known his objections to the advance of "democracy", notably in his speech in 1865 on Sir Edward Baines's Borough Franchise Bill. He was not invited to join the new ministry. Lowe retired into what Bright called the "Cave of Adullam", and with other Liberals and Whig peers (known collectively as the 'Adullamites' ) opposed the bill in a series of brilliant speeches, which raised his reputation as an orator to its highest point and helped to cause government's downfall.

However, Benjamin Disraeli who led the subsequent Conservative government proposed his own Reform Bill, which by splitting the parties succeeded to become the Reform Act 1867. As he said in the third reading of the Bill, Lowe thought any step towards democracy was bad because it engendered "a right existing in the individual as opposed to general expediency… numbers as against wealth and intellect". So the bill contained "the terms of endless agitation".

Proponents of the Bill argued a lower property qualification would give the vote to respectable members of the working class. But Lowe thought:

Being a man of company law, Robert Lowe saw unions as a threat to the order, which as he drafted, allowed only for social participation through investment of capital, not investment of labour. As it was the case that participation in Parliament was also only possible through possession of property, Lowe was fearful that a change in one part of the world he understood would lead to another, ending in unforeseeable chaos.

Lowe concluded his speech with considerable flair.

Gladstone Ministry 

In spite of the fact that his appeals did not prevent the passing of the Second Reform Act, Robert Lowe beat Walter Bagehot in the next election to become the first Member of Parliament (MP) for the London University, a new constituency created by the very Act he opposed.  In 1868 he accepted office in the Gladstone Cabinet as Chancellor of the Exchequer, an office that he described in the following terms in the House of Commons on 11 April 1870: "The Chancellor of the Exchequer is a man whose duties make him more or less of a taxing machine. He is entrusted with a certain amount of misery which it is his duty to distribute as fairly as he can."

Lowe was a rather cut-and-dried economist, who prided himself that during his four years of office he took twelve millions off taxation; but later opinion has hardly accepted his removal of the shilling registration duty on corn (1869) as good statesmanship, and his failures are remembered rather than his successes. His proposed tax of a halfpenny a box on Lucifer matches in 1871 (for which he suggested the epigram ex luce lucellum, "out of light a little profit") roused a storm of opposition, and had to be dropped. In 1873 he was transferred to the Home Office, but in 1874 the government resigned.

Later years
Lowe spoke against the Royal Titles Bill 1876 at East Retford and implied that Queen Victoria had been responsible for the bill's introduction.  As a result, when the Liberals returned to power in 1880, Victoria made it clear that she would not accept any ministry that included Lowe. Nevertheless, he was raised to the peerage as Viscount Sherbrooke, of Sherbrooke in the County of Surrey (a peerage that would become extinct on his death), against the express wishes of Queen Victoria, but with the backing of William Gladstone. In 1885, he was also further honoured by being created Knight Grand Cross of the Order of the Bath. But from 1875 till his death at Warlingham, Surrey, his health was constantly failing, and by degrees he figured less and less in public life. He became a supporter of the Liberal Unionist party in 1886.

During the 1870s the following epitaph was suggested for him by one of the wits of his day:
Here lies poor old Robert Lowe;
Where he's gone to I don't know;
If to the realms of peace and love,
Farewell to happiness above;
If, haply, to some lower level,
We can't congratulate the devil.

Lowe was delighted with this, and promptly translated it into Latin, as follows:
Continentur hac in fossa
Humilis Roberti ossa;
Si ad coelum evolabit,
Pax in coelo non restabit;
Sin in inferis jacebit,
Diabolum ejus poenitebit.

On his death he was buried in Brookwood Cemetery.

Australian federal electoral division 
The Division of Lowe, a now abolished Australian electoral division located in Sydney, was named after him.

Arms

See also

Liberal Party (UK)
Reform Act 1867
UK company law

Notes

Bibliography

Own works 
 Poems of a Life (1884)

Sources 
 Briggs, Asa. “Robert Lowe and the Fear of Democracy," in Briggs, Victorian People (1955) pp. 232–263. online

External links

 
Parliamentary Archives, Papers of Robert Lowe, Viscount Sherbrooke

1811 births
1892 deaths
Chancellors of the Exchequer of the United Kingdom
British Secretaries of State
Liberal Party (UK) MPs for English constituencies
UK MPs 1852–1857
UK MPs 1857–1859
UK MPs 1859–1865
UK MPs 1865–1868
UK MPs 1868–1874
UK MPs 1874–1880
UK MPs who were granted peerages
Members of the Parliament of the United Kingdom for London University
Sherbrooke
Knights Grand Cross of the Order of the Bath
Alumni of University College, Oxford
People from Bingham, Nottinghamshire
Members of the Privy Council of the United Kingdom
People with albinism
Fellows of the Royal Society
Members of the New South Wales Legislative Council
Burials at Brookwood Cemetery
Presidents of the Oxford Union
Peers of the United Kingdom created by Queen Victoria